Alexander John Wilfred Deuchar (born 10 December 1988) is an English cricketer.  Deuchar is a right-handed batsman who bowls right-arm medium pace.  He was born in Darlington, County Durham.

Deuchar was educated at the British International School in Riyadh, Saudi Arabia, and at Carmel Roman Catholic School in Darlington.  While studying for his degree at Durham University, Deuchar made his first-class debut for Durham MCCU against Durham in 2011.  He made a further first-class appearance for the team in 2011, against Warwickshire.  In these two first-class matches, he has taken 5 wickets at an average of 30.00, with best figures of 4/50.

Alex now lives in Melbourne, Victoria where he captains the reigning premiers Mt Waverley. In season 2015/16, Deuchar won the 1st XI bowling average for the club after sustaining an injury which pulled him out for half the season. He collected 22 wickets @ 15.14 with his best bowling being 6 for 54.

References

External links
Alex Deuchar at ESPNcricinfo
Alex Deuchar at CricketArchive

1988 births
Living people
Sportspeople from Darlington
Cricketers from County Durham
Alumni of Durham University
English cricketers
Durham MCCU cricketers